Egon von Jordan (19 March 1902 – 27 December 1978) was an Austrian film actor. He appeared in more than 80 films between 1923 and 1974.

Selected filmography

 The Ghost of Morton's Castle (1922)
 Young Medardus (1923)
 Lace (1926)
 Vienna - Berlin (1926)
 One Does Not Play with Love (1926)
 When the Young Wine Blossoms (1927)
 Poor Little Colombine (1927)
 Autumn on the Rhine (1928)
 Girls, Beware! (1928)
 Queen Louise (1928)
 Men Behind Bars (1931)
 Our Emperor (1933)
 A Star Fell from Heaven (1934)
 Such Great Foolishness (1937)
 Vienna Tales (1940)
 My Daughter Lives in Vienna (1940)
 Vienna Blood (1942)
 Gabriele Dambrone (1943)
 Music in Salzburg (1944)
 Viennese Girls (1945)
 Shame on You, Brigitte! (1952)
 Adventure in Vienna (1952)
 Stolen Identity (1953)
 A Night in Venice (1953)
 Once I Will Return (1953)
 Bel Ami (1955)
 The Blue Danube (1955)
 Mozart (1955)
 The Doctor's Secret (1955)
 Scandal in Bad Ischl (1957)
 Sebastian Kneipp (1958)
 Town Without Pity (1961)
 Romance in Venice (1962)
  (1963, TV film)

References

External links
 

1902 births
1978 deaths
People from Duchcov
German Bohemian people
Austrian male film actors
Austrian male silent film actors
Austrian people of German Bohemian descent
20th-century Austrian male actors